Niall Rowark is a Hong Kong Rugby Union player. He plays for the Hong Kong Football Club and the  National Team at the Fly-half position.

Career
Rowark represented Hong Kong A in 2008 in a test series against Claremont College from USA. He featured in the 2015 Asian Rugby Championship.

References

Living people
Hong Kong international rugby union players
Hong Kong rugby union players
Year of birth missing (living people)